The Touchables is a 1968 British crime drama film directed by Robert Freeman and written by Ian La Frenais from a story by Donald Cammell. It stars Judy Huxtable, Esther Anderson and James Villiers.

The screenplay was written by Ian La Frenais, who had created the comedy The Likely Lads for television with his partner Dick Clement. It was the first of only two films directed by Robert Freeman, the photographer responsible for a number of Beatles album covers. A mannequin of Diana Dors which appears in the film was the same model as was used in the cover montage of Sgt. Pepper's Lonely Hearts Club Band.

Other cast members include John Ronane, Peter Gordeno, Harry Baird, Simon Williams and Joan Bakewell in a cameo role as an interviewer. The cast also includes appearances by many popular British wrestlers, including Ricki Starr, Steve Veidor, Danny Lynch and Bruno Elrington.

Largely ignored on its release and since, owing to the scarcity of prints, it has recently acquired cult status of its type, in part due to a DVD release.

Donald Cammell, who shares story credit, would later rework its themes in Performance (1970).

Plot
In Swinging London, four girls decide to kidnap their pop idol and hold him hostage in a giant plastic dome in the countryside. His manager tries desperately to find him, as does a wrestler and an upper-class London gangster. However, it becomes clear that the young man does not want to be freed from his glamorous captors.

Cast
 Judy Huxtable - Sadie
 Esther Anderson - Melanie
Marilyn Rickard - Busbee
Kathy Simmonds - Samson
 David Anthony - Christian
James Villiers - Twyning
 John Ronane - Kasher
Ricki Starr - Ricki
Harry Baird - Lillywhite
Michael Chow - Denzil
Joan Bakewell - Interviewer
Peter Gordeno - Jimmy
Simon Williams - Nigel

Reception
Renata Adler, writing in The New York Times, described the film as a sort of fidgety mod pornography, which uses the advertising convention for eroticism—cutting abruptly from teasing sex scenes to gadgetry, in this case pinball machines, trampolines and odd items of furniture and clothing. Robert Freeman, who directs (his first feature film) is a former fashion photographer... There is no question of acting, since the range of expressions runs from seductive to sinister to mod vacuous.

Box Office
According to Fox records, the film required $2,600,000 in rentals to break even and by 11 December 1970 had made $825,000 so made a loss to the studio.

References

External links
 

1968 films
British drama films
1968 drama films
20th Century Fox films
British sexploitation films
Films with screenplays by Ian La Frenais
Films set in London
Films scored by Ken Thorne
1960s English-language films
1960s British films